The Medicine is an album by West Coast hip hop artist Planet Asia, released on October 3, 2006, through ABB Records. The album is the third installment of Planet Asia's "Medicali series", following The Sickness and The Diagnosis. The Medicine is produced by Evidence of Dilated Peoples, and features guest appearances from Krondon, Phil Da Agony, Black Thought, Jonell, Prodigy, Defari and Evidence and Rakaa of Dilated Peoples. The album's lead single is "Thick Ropes" b/w "On Your Way 93706".

Track listing

Samples
All the Names
"Go D.J." by Lil Wayne
Da Prescription
"Is That the Way" by The Message
In Love With You
"I Cram to Understand U" by MC Lyte
No Questions Asked
"Survival of the Fittest" by Mobb Deep
The Medicine
"Long Red" by Mountain
"Come Closer" by Salma Agha
"Keep It Thoro" by Prodigy
Thick Ropes
"Space Guerilla" by Missus Beastly

References

2006 albums
Planet Asia albums
Albums produced by the Alchemist (musician)